4-tert-Butylcatechol (TBC) is an organic chemical compound which is a derivative of catechol.  TBC is available in the form of a solid crystal flake and 85% solution in methanol or water.

Uses 
It is added as a stabilizer and polymerisation inhibitor to butadiene, styrene, vinyl acetate, divinylbenzene and other reactive monomer streams. 

TBC is also used as a stabilizer in the manufacture of polyurethane foam. It also can be used as an antioxidant for synthetic rubber, polymers and oil derivatives.  It can be used as purification agent for aminoformate catalysts. 

It is 25 times better than hydroquinone at 60 °C for polymerization inhibitory effect.

See also
  tert-Butylhydroquinone

References

Sources
 US Patent 4061545:Polymerization inhibitor for vinyl aromatic compounds
 US Patent 3046472: Substituted Catechol Antioxidants

Catechols
Antioxidants
Alkylphenols
Tert-butyl compounds